Apisai Koroisau (born 7 November 1992) is a Fiji international rugby league footballer who plays as a  for the Wests Tigers in the NRL. 

A triple NRL premiership winner with the South Sydney Rabbitohs and the Penrith Panthers, he previously played for the Manly Warringah Sea Eagles in the National Rugby League.

Background
Koroisau was born in Sydney, New South Wales, Australia and is of Fijian descent. He played his junior football for the Berala Bears, before being signed by the South Sydney Rabbitohs.

Playing career

Early career
Koroisau played for the South Sydney Rabbitohs NYC team in 2011 and 2012.

2013
Koroisau moved on to the South Sydney New South Wales Cup team, the North Sydney Bears at Norths Koroisau made a total of 25 appearances and scored 6 tries in 2013.

In October 2013, Koroisau was named in the Fijian 2013 World Cup squad. Koroisau made his debut for Fiji in Round 1 of the tournament against Ireland in the 32-14 win at Spotland Stadium. Koroisau played in 4 matches in the tournament.

2014
In Round 4 of the 2014 NRL season, Koroisau made his NRL debut for the South Sydney Rabbitohs at  against the Canberra Raiders in South Sydney's 30-18 loss at ANZ Stadium. In Round 8 ANZAC Day match against the Brisbane Broncos, Koroisau scored his first NRL career try, and the game's opening try, in South Sydney's last minute 28-26 penalty goal win at Suncorp Stadium. On 3 June 2014, Koroisau signed a two-year contract with the Penrith Panthers starting in 2015. In the week leading up to Souths 2014 NRL Grand Final against the Canterbury-Bankstown Bulldogs, after South Sydney hooker Issac Luke was ruled out from the Grand Final for his high tackle on Sydney Roosters player Sonny Bill Williams a week earlier in Souths 32-22 Preliminary Final win, Koroisau was Luke's replacement at hooker for the match on 5 October 2014, in Souths 30-6 Grand Final victory. Koroisau was rated a 7 out of 10 player rating by Rugby League Week for his performance in the Grand Final. Koroisau finished his debut year in the NRL in 2014 season with him playing in 14 matches and scoring a try for the South Sydney club.

2015
On 24 January 2015, Koroisau was named in Penrith's 2015 Auckland Nines squad. On 2 May 2015, he played for Fiji against Papua New Guinea in the 2015 Melanesian Cup. On 2 July 2015, he signed a three-year contract with the Manly-Warringah Sea Eagles starting in 2016, after being released from the final year of his Penrith contract. He finished off his first stint with the Penrith club having played in 16 matches, scoring one try and kicking four goals.

2016
In Round 1 of the 2016 NRL season, Koroisau made his club debut for Manly-Warringah against the Canterbury-Bankstown Bulldogs, starting at hooker in the Sea Eagles' 8-26 loss at Brookvale Oval. However, he was dropped to New South Wales Cup in favour of Matt Parcell after the Sea Eagles lost 22-36 to the Wests Tigers in Round 2 at Leichhardt Oval. He was recalled to the team for their Round 5 match against his former club South Sydney following an ankle injury that ruled out representative halfback Daly Cherry-Evans. Playing at halfback, Koroisau scored his first club try for Manly in their 12-16 loss at Brookvale Oval. Despite the loss, his performance on the night won him the Man of the Match award from match broadcaster Channel 9. He backed up his performance against the Rabbitohs when he was again one of Manly's leading players in their 34-18 away win over the New Zealand Warriors in Round 6.

2017
In the 2017 NRL season, Koroisau played 23 games, scored 3 tries and kicked 1 goal for Manly. He was selected in the Prime Minister's XIII in the 48-8 win over Papua New Guinea at PNG Football Stadium. Koroisau was selected in the Fiji 24-man squad in the 2017 Rugby League World Cup campaign. He played 5 matches and kicked 13 goals.

2018
Koroisau made 13 appearances for Manly in 2018 as the club endured a horrid season on and off the field narrowly avoiding the wooden spoon by 2 competition points.

2019
On 30 August, Koroisau signed a three-year deal with the Penrith Panthers that starts in 2020 and ends at the end of 2022 after he was releasesd by Manly as he was no longer starting because Manase Fainu had taken the starting hooker role after forming an excellent combination with Tom Trbojevic .  Koroisau made 22 appearances for Manly in the 2019 NRL season as the club qualified for the finals after finishing in sixth place.  Koroisau played in the club's elimination final victory over Cronulla and also featured in Manly's elimination final loss against his former club South Sydney at ANZ Stadium.

2020
Koroisau played 20 games for Penrith in the 2020 NRL season as the club finished as Minor Premiers.  He played in the 2020 NRL Grand Final where Penrith lost to Melbourne 26-20 at ANZ Stadium.

2021 
Koroisau was selected as 18th man in the NSW Blues State of Origin team for the 2021 series. Following injuries to halves Nathan Cleary and Jarome Luai ahead of game three of the series, Koroisau made his debut for New South Wales in the number 14 jersey. scoring a try in the 20-18 loss, however New South Wales had already clinched the series by winning the first two games 50-6 and 26-0 respectively.

On 22 July, Koroisau was placed under investigation by the NRL after allegations were made that he invited a woman into the NSW Blues bubble during the series, against strict biosecurity regulations. He was alleged to have snuck the woman in on two separate occasions, with the second coming on the day of Game Two on 27 June. The following day, he was fined $35,000 and suspended for two matches over the incident. It was also revealed the woman he brought back to the hotel was not his wife. On 4 August 2021, he was fined an additional $15,000 by the NSWRL over the incident.

Koroisau played a total of 18 games for Penrith in the 2021 including the club's 2021 NRL Grand Final victory over South Sydney. It was his second premiership as a player.

On 2 December, he signed a two-year deal with the Wests Tigers starting in the 2023 season.

2022
Koroisau played 25 games for Penrith in the 2022 NRL season including the clubs 2022 NRL Grand Final victory over Parramatta.

References

External links
Manly Sea Eagles profile
Manly Warringah Sea Eagles profile
NRL profile
2017 RLWC profile
Fiji profile

1992 births
Living people
Australian rugby league players
Australian people of I-Taukei Fijian descent
Fiji national rugby league team players
Penrith Panthers players
Manly Warringah Sea Eagles players
New South Wales Rugby League State of Origin players
North Sydney Bears NSW Cup players
Rugby league hookers
Rugby league five-eighths
Rugby league players from Sydney
South Sydney Rabbitohs players
Wests Tigers captains
Wests Tigers players